Hayley Anne Sacks (born January 23, 1991) is an American former pair skater who competed internationally for Israel.

Career
Sacks originally competed in the United States as a single skater.

In 2007, she teamed up with Vadim Akolzin to compete in pairs for Israel. They are the 2008 Israeli silver medalists and placed 17th at the 2008 World Figure Skating Championships. They repeated as national silver medalists at the 2008–09 Israeli Championships. Their partnership ended following that competition.

Programs
(with Akolzin)

Competitive highlights

Pairs with Akolzin for Israel

Singles for the United States

References

External links
 
 Hayley Anne Sacks / Vadim Akolzin at Tracings.net

Israeli female pair skaters
1991 births
Living people
Sportspeople from New York City